Old Hickory is a neighborhood of metropolitan Nashville located in the Hadley Bend section of eastern Davidson County, Tennessee.

Etymology
Old Hickory is named in honor of President Andrew Jackson, nicknamed "Old Hickory."

History
Old Hickory is probably best known for being a former company town as the site of a large DuPont plant. Many of the houses were built to house DuPont employees and supervisors in the early days of the factory's existence. Many historic homes are located in the area known as the Village of Old Hickory, containing a number that are listed on the National Register of Historic Places. The smaller bungalow houses were built by DuPont as residences for factory workers, with the larger homes being designated for management. Many of the formerly dilapidated houses are being renovated and gentrified.

Geography

Scope
It is bordered by the Cumberland River on the north and west, Old Hickory Lake to the east, and the former city of Lakewood to the south. To the north of the area is also the location of Old Hickory Lock and Dam. The main street through the area is Tennessee State Route 45 (Old Hickory Boulevard/Robinson Road). Old Hickory has its own post office, assigned ZIP Code 37138. The postal service area that uses the "Old Hickory" mailing address includes portions of Wilson and Davidson counties. 

The Old Hickory Post Office was added to the National Register of Historic Places listings in Davidson County, Tennessee on August 6, 1985.

Climate
Diurnal temperature variation is highest in April and lowest in January. Old Hickory's climate classifications are Köppen Cfa and Trewartha DOak thanks to its very hot summers (average over ), mild winters (average over ) and 4-7 month growing seasons (average over ). Precipitation is abundant year-round without any major difference, but there is still slight variation. The wet season runs from February through July, reaching its zenith in April with 120 mm of rain. The dry season runs from August through January with an October/November nadir of 85 mm and secondary December peak of 113 mm.

Economy
Old Hickory is the site of a country club, large golf course, city park, a Chamber of Commerce, and the DuPont plant, which has been mostly shut down but continues to employ a few hundred workers. The Nashville National Weather Service Forecast Office is located just to the southeast in nearby Wilson County.

Notable people
Nate Bargatze (1979-),  a stand up comedian and actor
Cathy Gordon Brown (1965-),  an independent candidate for President of the United States in the 2000 presidential election
Danika & the Jeb (19??-), a musical duo (Danika Holmes and Jeb Hart)
Darren Jernigan (1969-), Tennessee Democratic politician
Jack Kershaw (1913–2010), attorney and sculptor who represented James Earl Ray
William F. Lyell (1921–1951), a corporal in the United States Army during the Korean War; posthumously received the Medal of Honor
Ken Shipp (1929–2012), American college and professional football coach
Mike Turner (1955-), a Tennessee Democratic politician
Edgar S. Woolard, Jr. (1934-), former chairman and chief executive officer of DuPont

See also
List of memorials to Andrew Jackson

References

External links

 
 

Andrew Jackson
Company towns in Tennessee
Former municipalities in Tennessee
Neighborhoods in Nashville, Tennessee
Populated places in Davidson County, Tennessee
Populated places in Wilson County, Tennessee